Formula One 99 is a racing video game developed by Studio 33 and published by Psygnosis for PlayStation and Microsoft Windows. It is the sequel to the 1998 video game Formula 1 98 and was based on the 1999 Formula One World Championship.

Following the disappointment of Formula 1 98, and the subsequent split with Visual Science, Psygnosis hired Studio 33 to develop Formula One 99, after their successful development of Newman/Haas Racing the previous year. During production of the game, Sony completed a full acquisition of Psygnosis, making this the final Formula One game to be published under the Psygnosis name.

The game is unique in having substitute drivers appear in the game as they did in the real 1999 season (such as Mika Salo replacing Michael Schumacher for the races between Austria and Europe). A new grid editor tool was also introduced, allowing players to customise the starting grid to their own liking before a race. Despite the lack of an arcade mode that had featured in previous titles, the game was widely praised as an overwhelming improvement in comparison to the 1998 game.

Reception

The PlayStation version received "favorable" reviews according to the review aggregation website GameRankings. Official UK PlayStation Magazine said that the game "put the series back on track after last year's debacle", with top gameplay and a true sense of speed. GameSpot said: "Formula One 99 has great control and enough settings to keep any longtime fan of the Formula One series glued to the TV for quite some time". IGN said: "Welcome to the best F1 game on the PlayStation". In Japan, where the PlayStation version was ported and published by Sony Computer Entertainment on October 21, 1999, Famitsu gave it a score of 28 out of 40.

References

External links
 

1999 video games
Formula One video games
Multiplayer and single-player video games
PlayStation (console) games
Video game sequels
Video games set in Australia
Video games set in Austria
Video games set in Brazil
Video games set in Belgium
Video games set in Canada
Video games set in France
Video games set in Germany
Video games set in Hungary
Video games set in Italy
Video games set in Japan
Video games set in Malaysia
Video games set in Monaco
Video games set in Spain
Video games set in the United Kingdom
Windows games
Psygnosis games
Video games developed in the United Kingdom